WVC may refer to:
Windows Virtual Console
Wenatchee Valley College
World Vegetable Center